The Ministry of Productivity Promotion was a former cabinet ministry of the Government of Sri Lanka responsible for oversight of the country's labour market through policy formulation and implementation for skills development of the national workforce, with a targeted national productivity growth of 5-6% annually.

List of ministers

Parties

See also
 List of ministries of Sri Lanka

References

External links
 Ministry of Productivity Promotion
 Government of Sri Lanka

Productivity Promotion
Productivity Promotion
Productivity organizations